The title King of Syria appeared in the second century BC in referring to the Seleucid kings who ruled the entirety of the region of Syria. It was also used to refer to Aramean kings in the Greek translations of the Old Testament, mainly indicating the kings of Aram-Damascus. Following the defeat of the Ottoman Empire in World War I, the region came under the rule of France, the United Kingdom and Prince Faisal of Hejaz, who was proclaimed King of Syria on 8 March 1920. Faisal's reign lasted a few months before he was overthrown by France and the title fell out of use.

Background

The term Syria was first applied by Herodotus in the 5th century BC to indicate a region generally extending between Anatolia and Egypt. With the advent of the Hellenistic period, Greeks and their Seleucid dynasty used the term "Syria" to designate the region between the Mediterranean and the Euphrates. The usage of the name in referring to the region during the Iron Age (ended 586 BC) is a modern practice.

List of monarchs

Seleucid dynasty
According to Polybius, King Antigonus I Monophthalmus established the Syrian kingdom which included Coele-Syria. The Seleucid king Antiochus III the Great defeated the Ptolemaic Kingdom in the Battle of Panium (200 BC); he annexed the Syrian lands controlled by Egypt (Coele-Syria) and united them with his Syrian lands, thus gaining control of the entirety of Syria. Starting from the 2nd century BC, ancient writers, such as Polybius and Posidonius, began referring to the Seleucid ruler as the king of Syria. The evidence for this title's usage by the kings is provided by the inscription of Antigonus son of Menophilus, who described himself as the "admiral of Alexander, king of Syria" (Alexander refers either to Alexander I Balas or Alexander II Zabinas).

Non-dynastic

Diodotus Tryphon, who opposed Demetrius II by raising Antiochus VI to the throne, killed his protege and declared himself king ruling until 138 when the Seleucids unified Syria again.

Seleucid dynasty

Ptolemaic dynasty

Seleucid dynasty

Ptolemaic dynasty

Seleucid dynasty

Artaxiad dynasty

Seleucid dynasty

Antonian dynasty

Hashemite dynasty
On 8 March 1920, prince Faysal of the House of Hashim, supported by the Syrian National Congress, declared himself king of the Arab Kingdom of Syria; the kingdom collapsed on 24 July of the same year.

Biblical usage for Aramean kings
In the first translation of the Old Testament into Greek written during the third century BC (called the Septuagint), Aram and Arameans were often translated as Syria and the Syrians; hence, the king was referred to as the king of Syria, and this was carried on by many English translations. Aram in the Hebrew Old Testament and Syria in the translation indicated the kingdom of Aram-Damascus most of the times. Occasionally, other Aramean regions were also referred to as Syria. In the view of W. Edward Glenny, the rendering of Aram by Syria might be explained by an anti-Syrian bias, since at the time of the translation, Syria belonged to the Seleucids, the Jews' main enemy; Aram-Damascus was the Jews' enemy during its Iron Age prime in the 9th century BC.

Aramean kings referred to as "kings of Syria"

See also

List of Seleucid rulers
List of Palmyrene monarchs
History of Syria
Greater Syria
Syrian nationalism

Notes

References

Citations

Sources

Monarchs
History of the Levant